Sanjeev Dhurandhar is Professor at IUCAA, Pune. His research interest is detection and observation of Gravitational waves. Dhurandhar was part of the Indian team which contributed to the detection of gravitational waves. He is the science advisor to the IndIGO consortium council.

He was awarded one of the H K Firodia awards for 2016.

See also
LIGO
INDIGO
Jayant Narlikar

References

Academic staff of Savitribai Phule Pune University
Living people
Indian physicists
Year of birth missing (living people)
Fellows of the American Physical Society